Canoga station is a station on the G Line of the Los Angeles Metro Busway system located on Canoga Avenue in Canoga Park, in the western San Fernando Valley. It is part of the Los Angeles Metro Busway system.

History 

Canoga was built as an infill station and was opened on December 27, 2006, about 14 months after the other stations eastward on the line opened.
 Canoga was built to alleviate the lack of parking available at other Orange Line stations in the West Valley, providing a total of 612 new parking spaces at opening, and was also built to be the starting point for the extension northward to Chatsworth.

The  Metro Orange Line Chatsworth Extension was completed on June 30, 2012, from Canoga Station north through downtown Canoga Park to the Chatsworth Amtrak/Metrolink Station in Chatsworth. The extension travels north–south along Canoga Avenue. The Canoga station parking lot capacity was reduced to 258 spaces for the Metro Orange Line route's extension north, but a 207 space parking lot was included at the next new stop, the Sherman Way station.

The Chatsworth Extension project added two new platforms to the station, for a total of four platforms. The newer platforms serving the Chatsworth extension were northbound platform #1 and eastbound platform #2. The original platforms used by buses serving Warner Center were renumbered as westbound platform #3 and eastbound platform #4. A digital message sign was installed at the entrance to the station which indicated at what time the next Orange Line bus will arrive, its destination, and the platform it will stop at.

With the elimination of the Warner Center station in June 2018, the original platforms are now used by terminating G Line buses and by local buses.

Service

Station Layout

Hours and frequency

Connections 
, the following connections are available:
Antelope Valley Transit Authority: 787
City of Santa Clarita Transit: 796

Nearby destinations 
Metro Orange Line bicycle path
Westfield Topanga Plaza & Village — 1 block walk west from station, Victory & Owensmouth.

References

External links 

LA Metro: Orange Line map and stations — route map and station addresses and features
LA Metro: Orange Line Timetable — schedules
Orange Line history
 LA Metro – countywide: official website

Los Angeles Metro Busway stations
Canoga Park, Los Angeles
G Line (Los Angeles Metro)
Public transportation in the San Fernando Valley
Public transportation in Los Angeles
Bus stations in Los Angeles
2006 establishments in California